John McQuade (9 August 1911 – 19 November 1984) was a Northern Ireland politician.  He was a professional boxer under the name of Jack Higgins.

After serving with the British Army in Dunkirk and Burma, he was an Ulster Unionist Party (UUP) member of Belfast City Council from 1955 to 1972.  He was a UUP Member of the House of Commons of Northern Ireland for Belfast Woodvale (Greater Shankill) from 1965 to October 1971, when he resigned from the UUP and joined the Democratic Unionist Party. On 28 March 1972 (the last day the Parliament sat), he resigned his parliamentary seat in protest at the prorogation of the Parliament.

In February 1972, in response to the escalating violence in Northern Ireland, he called for the British security forces to take over the town of Newry and for the border with the Republic of Ireland to be closed, stating his belief that the Roman Catholic Church controlled the government of the Republic of Ireland.

He contested the February and October 1974 Westminster elections unsuccessfully for Belfast West. He was elected as the Member of Parliament for Belfast North in 1979, aged 67, and served until 1983, when he retired. He died on 19 November 1984, aged 73.

References

Bibliography
Times Guide to the House of Commons, 1979

External links 
 

1911 births
1984 deaths
Democratic Unionist Party MPs
Members of the Parliament of the United Kingdom for Belfast constituencies (since 1922)
UK MPs 1979–1983
Ulster Unionist Party members of the House of Commons of Northern Ireland
Democratic Unionist Party members of the House of Commons of Northern Ireland
Members of the House of Commons of Northern Ireland for Belfast constituencies
Members of the House of Commons of Northern Ireland 1965–1969
Members of the House of Commons of Northern Ireland 1969–1973
Members of the Northern Ireland Assembly 1973–1974
Ulster Protestant Action members
British Army personnel of World War II